MMI may refer to:

Science and technology 
 Man-machine interface or user interface
 Modified Mercalli intensity scale, an earthquake intensity measure
 W3C MMI or Multimodal Interaction Activity
 Monolithic Memories, Inc. (1969–1987), an American semiconductor manufacturer
 Motorola Mobility (NYSE: MMI), a publicly traded electronics company, formerly part of Motorola
 Multi Media Interface, an in-car interface system developed by Audi
 Maximum mutual information criterion
 Methimazole, a drug used to treat hyperthyroidism
 Multi mode interferometer
  Modified Mecalli Index

Music
 Miss May I, a metalcore band from Ohio
 Madurai Mani Iyer, Indian singer

Schools 
 Marion Military Institute, a  military junior college in Marion, Alabama
 Marymount International School of Rome, a private Catholic school in Rome, Italy
 Miami Military Institute, a former military college that was located in Germantown, Ohio
 Millersburg Military Institute, a defunct military school in Kentucky
 MMI Preparatory School, a college preparatory school in Freeland, Pennsylvania
 Motorcycle Mechanics Institute, a program of the Universal Technical Institute

Other uses 
 2001 (year)
 2001 or MMI in Roman numerals
 Manufacturers Mutual Insurance, a former Australian insurance company, now called Allianz Australia
 Municipal Mutual Insurance, a British insurance company
 Maximum medical improvement, a plateau in a person's healing process
 McMinn County Airport's identification code
 Multiple mini interview, an interview method to assess soft skills
 Muslim Mosque, Inc., an organization founded by Malcolm X
 NYSE Arca Major Market Index

See also
 2001 (disambiguation)